Black-tailed antechinus may refer to:

 Antechinus arktos (Black-tailed antechinus, Baker et al., 2014), small Australian marsupial discovered in 2014
 Black-tailed dasyure, (Murexechinus melanurus)